Arene adusta is a species of sea snail, a marine gastropod mollusk in the family Areneidae.

Description

The shell can grow up to be 5 mm in length.

Distribution
Arene adusta can be found from Baja California to Panama.

References

External links
 To ITIS
 To World Register of Marine Species

Areneidae
Gastropods described in 1970